Freie Presse ('Free Press') was a German-language daily newspaper published in Alsace. It was published as Freie Presse für Elsass-Lothringen between 1898 and 1918, and as Freie Presse/La Presse Libre 1919-1939 and 1944–1960. The newspaper, edited by Jacques Peirotes, was one of the most constitently pro-French newspapers of Alsace.

The newspaper had a circulation of around 5,000 as of June 1930. It carried the byline "Sozialistisches Organ für das Departement des Nieder-Rheins" ('Socialist organ for the Bas-Rhin departement'). The newspaper was an organ of the French Section of the Workers International (SFIO).

References

Defunct newspapers published in France
Socialist newspapers
French Section of the Workers' International
German-language newspapers published in Alsace-Lorraine